Doug Clark is an American real estate investor and TV personality. Before getting into real estate, Doug also worked as an airline pilot. Between 2011 and 2012 he was featured on the Spike TV reality television series Flip Men alongside co-host Mike Baird. The series follows Baird and Clark as they purchase foreclosed houses at auction, remodel the homes and sell them for return profits.

Early life
Doug Clark was raised in Murray, Utah and went to college at the University of Utah. In 1997 he received a bachelor's degree in economics Magna Cum Laude, and became an airline pilot for Colgan Air. While there, he was both a first officer and pilot, and in 2004 he became a captain for SkyWest Airlines. On his days off, he developed an interest in real estate investment. He bought his first home at an auction, and resold it within three days. Clark continued to work as an airline pilot until 2011.

Real estate
Clark met with Mike Baird in 2004 to learn how to enter the property flipping industry, and shadowed Baird until 2005 when they formed Equity Capital Group and Clark Venture Capital together. The business of the companies was to finance their buying, renovating, and then reselling homes purchased at auction.

By late 2011 Clark had bought and sold 750 houses over five years in the Salt Lake City area, and by 2012 he had bought and sold one thousand. Clark has said that he only buys a small fraction of the homes he researches when looking for properties to invest in, and that the purchase price is the most important thing he looks at when making a decision on an investment. He has also been interviewed by the media regarding the best methods of house flipping and the differences between varying markets for property investments. He has also toured US home shows to give speeches about his business and has been interviewed about the logistics of purchasing homes at auction in regards to his television series.

Reality television
In 2009 Clark and Baird began working with television producer Danny Thompson to create a web series called Foreclosure Boys. The series involved the creation of about 90 YouTube videos per year about their business and different projects they would encounter. David Broome saw the videos and approached Clark and Baird about developing a reality television series surrounding their business.

In 2011 Clark and Baird began producing and starring in the reality television series Flip Men on Spike TV, which focused on the restoring of houses abandoned during the housing crash—in particular, the more extreme cases of property degradation in comparison to the rehabbed result are shown. The show debuted on October 25, 2011, featuring properties in Salt Lake City. The series was renewed for a second season in 2012, which received an audience of about one million viewers per episode and three million per week including reruns. Houses featured on the program include both smaller properties as well as large unkept mansions.

Seminars and events
After production of Spike TV's Flip Men halted in late 2012, Clark began to tour the country hosting real estate seminars. Clark's teaching platform focuses on three main teaches practices: Becoming a successful landlord, fixing and flipping homes, and using financing to flip wholesale properties.

References

Living people
University of Utah alumni
Participants in American reality television series
Aviators from Utah
American YouTubers
American real estate businesspeople
People from Murray, Utah
Businesspeople from Salt Lake City
Commercial aviators
Year of birth missing (living people)